Peter Karl-Johan Larsson (born 30 April 1984) is a Swedish former professional footballer who played as a centre back.

Club career
Starting his football career in IF Centern, alongside Swedish tennis player Sofia Arvidsson, he then in 1999 moved to local rivals Halmstads BK's youth squad in which he played until 2002, he played his first league match against Hammarby IF (1–1), in August 2004, started during 2006 to take over Lithuanian national player Tomas Žvirgždauskas position in the team, placing Žvirgždauskas more and more on the bench as a substitute.

In 2007, when Brazil was in Sweden for a game against Chile and Ghana, Larsson was one of four Swedish league players that were allowed to do one training pass with the Brazilian squad, the other players where Samuel Holmén, Johan Karlsson and Ari Da Silva.

On 25 July 2008, Larsson and Halmstad agreed a deal with Copenhagen, where he signed a five-year long contract.

On 5 September 2019, 35-year old Larsson announced that he would retire at the end of the season.

International career
He earned his first caps for the Sweden national football team in January 2008 when he played against Costa Rica and the United States. In the game against Costa Rica, he became the 1000th player to represent Sweden at top level.

Honours
FC Copenhagen
Danish Superliga: 2008–09, 2009–10
Danish Cup: 2008–09, 2011–12

References

External links
  
 Halmstads BK Profile 
 
 
 

1984 births
Living people
Swedish footballers
Swedish expatriate footballers
Sweden international footballers
Sweden under-21 international footballers
Halmstads BK players
F.C. Copenhagen players
Helsingborgs IF players
Allsvenskan players
Superettan players
Danish Superliga players
Association football defenders
Sportspeople from Halmstad
Swedish expatriate sportspeople in Denmark
Expatriate men's footballers in Denmark
Sportspeople from Halland County